Anthony Caruso (April 7, 1916 – April 4, 2003) was an American character actor in more than one hundred American films, usually playing villains and gangsters, including the first season of Walt Disney's  Zorro as Captain Juan Ortega.

Life and career

Caruso was born in Frankfort, Indiana, While acting at the Pasadena Playhouse, he met Alan Ladd, beginning a friendship that continued as they made 11 films together.

Caruso's early acting experience included performing with The Hart Players, a stock theater company that presented tent shows. He also acted with the Federal Theatre Project and was a star in plays at the Hollywood Playhouse.

He made his film debut in Henry Hathaway's Johnny Apollo (1940) starring Tyrone Power.

Caruso played “Ash”, on an early episode of CBS's Gunsmoke, and again in 1960 as “Gurney”, a cowboy. He also played “Lone Wolf” in a 1961 episode entitled “Indian Ford”, and in 1964 he played “Sims”, a surly cowboy in “Father’s Love”, as well as “Bull Foot” in a semi-comedic role in the episode “The Warden”.

In 1954, Caruso played Tiburcio Vásquez in an episode of the western series Stories of the Century. He appeared in the first Brian Keith series, Crusader. Among Caruso's other Western credits was 1954's Cattle Queen of Montana starring Barbara Stanwyck and Ronald Reagan. In 1957, he appeared in the fourth episode of the first season of the TV western Have Gun – Will Travel starring Richard Boone titled  "The Winchester Quarantine".

In 1956 Caruso appeared as Disalin with war hero Audie Murphy, Charles Drake and Anne Bancroft in Walk the Proud Land.

In 1957, Caruso appeared in episode "The Child" on NBC's The Restless Gun. In 1959, he was cast as George Bradley in the episode "Annie's Old Beau" on the NBC children's western series, Buckskin.

That same year, he portrayed Matt Cleary on CBS's Wanted: Dead or Alive episode "The Littlest Client", with Steve McQueen. Also 1959, he also guest-starred on the ABC/Warner Brothers western series, Sugarfoot, in the episode "The Extra Hand", along with guest stars Karl Swenson and Jack Lambert as well as the series star, Will Hutchins. The same year he appeared in the 'Syndicate Sanctuary' episode of The Untouchables.

In 1960, Caruso played a Cherokee  Indian, Chief White Bull, in the episode "The Long Trail" of the NBC western series, Riverboat, starring Darren McGavin.

Also in 1960, he returned to Gunsmoke playing a cowboy named Gurney in S6E5’s “Shooting Stopover”. 

In 1961, he appeared twice on the ABC/Warner Brothers drama series, The Roaring 20s, including the role of Lucky Lombardi in "The Maestro". He was also cast with Will Hutchins in a second The Roaring 20s episode entitled, "Pie in the Sky." Early in 1961, he was cast as Velde in the episode "Willy's Millionaire" of the short-lived ABC adventure series, The Islanders, with Diane Brewster.

Caruso guest-starred in an episode of the ABC western series, The Travels of Jaimie McPheeters, based on a Robert Lewis Taylor novel of the same name. Caruso guest-starred three times on CBS's Perry Mason.  In 1962, he played Keith Lombard in "The Case of the Playboy Pugilist." Also in 1962, Caruso played Cody Durham in "Cody's Code" on Gunsmoke.  In 1965, he made two Perry Mason appearances, both times as the murder victim: first as title character Enrico Bacio in "The Case of the Sad Sicilian," then as Harvey Rettig in "The Case of the Runaway Racer."

Caruson portrayed the title character in the 1963 Gunsmoke episode "Ash",  Also appearing with him are John Dehner and Adam West.

In 1964, he guest-starred in the Bonanza episode "The Saga of Squaw Charlie" playing a Native American man shunned by almost everybody and with only two friends, Ben Cartwright and a little girl named Angela. In 1969 he starred alongside Ricardo Montalbán in Desperate Mission, a fictionalized telling of the life of Joaquin Murrieta. From 1966 to 1970 he guest-starred three times on the long-running NBC western The Virginian, starring James Drury. In 1965 he guest-starred on ABC's The Addams Family as Don Xavier Molinas.

Some of his other roles were that of the alien gangster "Bela Oxmyx" in the classic Star Trek episode "A Piece of the Action", Chief Blackfish on the NBC series Daniel Boone, Mongo in the film Tarzan and the Leopard Woman, Sengo in Tarzan and the Slave Girl, and Louis Ciavelli (the "box man" or safecracker) in The Asphalt Jungle. Caruso played the comical character of the Native American "Red Cloud" on the 1965 Get Smart episode "Washington 4, Indians 3," and Chief Angry Bear in the episode "You Can't Scalp a Bald Indian" of Rango.

In 1970, Caruso made a guest appearance on the ABC crime drama The Silent Force in the episode "A Family Tradition." In 1974, he appeared in the final episode, entitled "The Fire Dancer," of the ABC police drama Nakia. Caruso also had a recurring roll as El Lobo on The High Chaparral.

Personal life
Caruso met his future wife, Tonia at the Alcazar Theater in 1939 in San Francisco, when the play she was in was closing and the play he was in was opening. Caruso was married for 63 years. He enjoyed gardening and cooking. He was the father of son Tonio.

On April 4, 2003, Caruso died at age 86 at his home in Los Angeles, California, three days before his 87th birthday.

Selected filmography

Johnny Apollo (1940) as Joe – Henchman
The Bride Wore Crutches (1940) as Max
North West Mounted Police (1940) as Half-breed at Riel's HQ (uncredited)
The Devil's Pipeline (1940) as Natoni – Henchman (uncredited)
Tall, Dark and Handsome (1941) as Gunman
The Corsican Brothers (1941) as Baron's Henchman (uncredited)
You're in the Army Now (1941) as Apache Dancer (uncredited)
Always in My Heart (1942) as Frank
Sunday Punch (1942) as Nat Cucci
Across the Pacific (1942) as Taxi Driver (uncredited)
Lucky Jordan (1942) as Hired Gun
The Ghost and the Guest (1943) as Henchman Ted
Above Suspicion (1943) as Italian Border Sentry (uncredited)
Jitterbugs (1943) as Mike (uncredited)
Watch on the Rhine (1943) as Italian Man
The Girl from Monterrey (1943) as Alberto 'Baby' Valdez
The Phantom (1943, Serial) as Count Silento (uncredited)
Whistling in Brooklyn (1943) as Henchman Fingers (uncredited)
The Racket Man (1944) as Tony Ciccardi (uncredited)
The Story of Dr. Wassell (1944) as Pharmacist's Mate on 'Marblehead' (uncredited)
U-Boat Prisoner (1944) as Benny, Seaman's Union Hall Man (uncredited)
Maisie Goes to Reno (1944) as George – Blackjack Dealer (uncredited)
The Conspirators (1944) as Fisherman (uncredited)
And Now Tomorrow (1944) as Peter Gallo (uncredited)
Objective, Burma! (1945) as Miggleori (uncredited)
The Crime Doctor's Courage (1945) as Miguel Bragga
Don Juan Quilligan (1945) as One Eyed Barton (uncredited)
Pride of the Marines (1945) as Johnny Rivers
I Love a Bandleader (1945) as Tony Ramon, Bandleader at El Caro (uncredited)
That Night with You (1945) as Tenor (uncredited)
The Stork Club (1945) as Joe – Fisherman (uncredited)
Tarzan and the Leopard Woman (1946) as Mongo
To Each His Own (1946) as Mobster (uncredited)
Night Editor (1946) as Tusco (uncredited)
The Blue Dahlia (1946) as Marine Corporal Playing Jukebox (uncredited)
The Catman of Paris (1946) as Raoul
Don't Gamble with Strangers (1946) as Pinky Luiz
The Last Crooked Mile (1946) as Charlie – Gang Member
Monsieur Beaucaire (1946) as Masked Horseman (uncredited)
My Favorite Brunette (1947) as First Man on Death Row (uncredited)
They Won't Believe Me (1947) as Tough Patient (uncredited)
News Hounds (1947) as Dapper Dan Greco
Wild Harvest (1947) as Pete
Escape Me Never (1947) as Dino Carbatto (uncredited)
Where There's Life (1947) as John Fulda
Devil Ship (1947) as Venetti
To the Victor (1948) as Nikki
Incident (1948) as Nails
Song of India (1949) as Major Doraj
Bride of Vengeance (1949) as Captain of the Guard
The Undercover Man (1949) as Salvatore Rocco
Illegal Entry (1949) as Teague
Anna Lucasta (1949) as Eddie
Scene of the Crime (1949) as Tony Rutzo
The Threat (1949) as Nick Damon
The Asphalt Jungle (1950) as Louis Ciavelli
Tarzan and the Slave Girl (1950) as Sengo
Prisoners in Petticoats (1950) as Nicky Bowman
According to Mrs. Hoyle (1951) as Morganti
His Kind of Woman (1951) as Tony (uncredited)
Pals of the Golden West (1951) as Lucky Grillo aka Jim Bradford
Boots Malone (1952) as Joe
Desert Pursuit (1952) as Hassan
The Iron Mistress (1952) as Black Jack Sturdevant
Blackbeard the Pirate (1952) as Pierre La Garde
The Man Behind the Gun (1953) as Vic Sutro
Desert Legion (1953) as Lt. Massaoud
Raiders of the Seven Seas (1953) as Renzo
Fort Algiers (1953) as Chavez
The Steel Lady (1953) as Zagora
Fighter Attack (1953) as Aldo
The Boy from Oklahoma (1954) as Barney Turlock
Saskatchewan (1954) as Spotted Eagle
Phantom of the Rue Morgue (1954) as Jacques the One-Eyed
Passion (1954) as Sergeant Muñoz
Drum Beat (1954) as Manok
Cattle Queen of Montana (1954) as Natchakoa
Santa Fe Passage (1955) as Chavez
The Magnificent Matador (1955) as Emiliano
City of Shadows (1955) as Tony Finetti
Jail Busters (1955) as Percival P. Lannigan
Tennessee's Partner (1955) as Turner
Toughest Man Alive (1955) as Pete Gore
Hell on Frisco Bay (1956) as Sebastian Pasmonick
When Gangland Strikes (1956) as Duke Martella
Walk the Proud Land (1956) as Disalin
A Cry in the Night (1956) as Tony Chavez
The Big Land (1957) as Brog
The Oklahoman (1957) as Jim Hawk
The Lawless Eighties (1957) as Wolf Chief
Omar Khayyam (1957) as Shah's Guard (uncredited)
Joe Dakota (1957) as Marcus Vizzini
Baby Face Nelson (1957) as John Hamilton
The Restless Gun (1957) as Father Basilico in "The Child" (Christmas episode)
Fort Massacre (1958) as Pawnee
The Badlanders (1958) as Comanche
Legion of the Doomed (1958) as Sgt. Calvelli
Never Steal Anything Small (1959) as Lt. Tevis
The Wonderful Country (1959) as Santiago Santos
Bonanza (1959, Episode: "The Paiute War") as Chief Winnemucca
Most Dangerous Man Alive (1961) as Andy Damon
Escape from Zahrain (1964) as Tahar
Where Love Has Gone (1964) as Rafael
Sylvia (1965) as Muscles
Young Dillinger (1965) as Rocco
Perry Mason (1965, Episode: "The Sad Sicilian") as Enrico Bacio
Star Trek (1968, Episode: "A Piece of the Action") as Bela Oxmyx
Never a Dull Moment (1968) as Tony Preston (uncredited)
Flap (1970) as Silver Dollar
Brother, Cry for Me (1970)
Eye for an Eye (1970)
Mission Impossible (1971) as 	Leonard Morgan
The Legend of Earl Durand (1974) as Sheriff Trask
Mean Johnny Barrows (1975) as Don Da Vince
Zebra Force (1976) as Salvatore Moreno
Mission to Glory: A True Story (1977) as Father Rodriguez
Claws (1977) as Henry
Hawaii Five-O (1978) "Invitation to Murder" as David Thorpe
Tierra sangrienta (1979)
Savage Harbor (1987) as Harry
The Legend of Grizzly Adams (1990) as Don Carlos (final film role)

References

External links

 

1916 births
2003 deaths
20th-century American male actors
American male film actors
American male television actors
American people of Italian descent
Male actors from Indiana
Male actors from Long Beach, California
People from Frankfort, Indiana
Western (genre) television actors
Federal Theatre Project people